PAGB can mean:

 Galbraith Lake Airport
 Photographic Alliance of Great Britain
 Proprietary Association of Great Britain, the UK trade association for manufacturers of over-the-counter medicines and food supplements